K.B. Lall (1917–2005) was an eminent and highly respected civil servant of India and a member of ICS. 
He was Principal Defence Secretary of India in Indo-Pak war in 1971. Earlier, he served as  Commerce Secretary as well as Ambassador to the European Common Market, as the European Union was then known. 

Ambassador Lall was also accredited to the Grand Duchy of Luxembourg. In this capacity he inaugurated with the former Minister of Foreign Affairs of Luxembourg, Mr. Gaston Thorn, the bust of Mahatma Gandhi in the Municipal Park in Luxembourg-City on 21 June 1973. The bronze bust sculpture by the famous modernist artist Amar Nath Sehgal (1922-2007) was a gift by the philanthropist Henry J. Leir.  

Greatly respected by Defence minister Jagjivan Ram, Lall's stewardship of the Ministry of defence contributed materially to the smooth conduct of, and victory in the 1971 War.

He was conferred Padma Vibhushan award in 2000.

He died at the age of 88 in 2005.

External links
 

Indian Civil Service (British India) officers
Indian civil servants
Recipients of the Padma Vibhushan in civil service
2005 deaths
Defence Secretaries of India
1917 births